The  is a Grade 2 flat horse race in Japan for three-year-old and above thoroughbreds run over a distance of 1,200 metres (approximately 6 furlongs) at Hanshin Racecourse in September.

It was first run in 1987 and takes its name from a statue at the racecourse in the form of the mythological creature centaur.

Prior to 2000 the race was run over a distance of 1,400 metres (7 furlongs), and having originally been classed as a Domestic Grade 3 race, it was promoted to Domestic Grade 2 status in 2006 and it was promoted to International Grade 2 status in 2007.

From 2005 to 2010 it was a leg of the Global Sprint Challenge series. It has now been replaced as a Japanese leg of the series by the Takamatsunomiya Kinen.

Winners 

* The 2006 and 2020 race took place at Chukyo Racecourse.

See also
 Horse racing in Japan
 List of Japanese flat horse races

References 

Open sprint category horse races
Turf races in Japan